Miao Bo (born 17 June 1975) is a Chinese basketball player. She competed in the women's tournament at the 1996 Summer Olympics.

References

1975 births
Living people
Chinese women's basketball players
Olympic basketball players of China
Basketball players at the 1996 Summer Olympics
People from Weihai
Shandong Six Stars players
Asian Games medalists in basketball
Asian Games gold medalists for China
Asian Games silver medalists for China
Basketball players at the 1998 Asian Games
Basketball players at the 2002 Asian Games
Medalists at the 1998 Asian Games
Medalists at the 2002 Asian Games